Ferdinand Lee Barnett may refer to:

Ferdinand Lee Barnett (Chicago) (1852–1936), journalist, lawyer, and civil rights activist in Illinois
Ferdinand L. Barnett (Omaha) (1854–1932), journalist, politician, and civil rights activist in Nebraska

See also 
 Ferdinand (disambiguation)